Events in the year 1998 in Mexico.

Incumbents

Federal government
 President: Ernesto Zedillo
 Interior Secretary (SEGOB): Emilio Chuayffet (until 3 January); Francisco Labastida (from 21 May)
 Secretary of Foreign Affairs (SRE): María del Rosario Green Macías
 Communications Secretary (SCT): Carlos Ruiz Sacristán
 Secretary of Defense (SEDENA): Enrique Cervantes Aguirre
 Secretary of Navy: José Ramón Lorenzo Franco
 Secretary of Labor and Social Welfare: José Antonio González Fernández
 Secretary of Welfare: Carlos Rojas Gutiérrez/Esteban Moctezuma 
 Secretary of Public Education: Miguel Limón Rojas
 Tourism Secretary (SECTUR): Óscar Espinosa Villarreal
 Secretary of the Environment (SEMARNAT): Julia Carabias Lillo
 Secretary of Health (SALUD): Juan Ramón de la Fuente

Supreme Court

 President of the Supreme Court: José Vicente Aguinaco Alemán

Governors

 Aguascalientes
Otto Granados Roldán, (Institutional Revolutionary Party, PRI), until November 30
Felipe González González, PAN, starting December 1
 Baja California:
Héctor Terán Terán, (National Action Party (PAN)), died in office, October 4.
Alejandro González Alcocer, Substitute, PAN
 Baja California Sur: Leonel Cota Montaño (PRD)/Guillermo Mercado Romero (PRI)
 Campeche: José Antonio González Curi 
 Chiapas: Julio Cesar Ruiz Ferro/Roberto Albores Guillén (PRI)
 Chihuahua: Francisco Barrio/Patricio Martínez García (PRI)
 Coahuila: Rogelio Montemayor Seguy (PRI)
 Colima: Fernando Moreno Peña (PRI)
 Durango: Ángel Sergio Guerrero Mier (PRI)
 Guanajuato: Vicente Fox (PAN)
 Guerrero: Angel Aguirre Rivero (PAN)
 Hidalgo: Jesús Murillo Karam/Alberto Cárdenas Jiménez (PAN)
 Jalisco: Humberto Lugo Gil/Manuel Angel Nunez Soto (PAN)
 State of Mexico: César Camacho Quiroz/Arturo Montiel Rojas (PRI)
 Michoacán: Víctor Manuel Tinoco
 Morelos: Antonio Riva Palacio López/Jorge Morales Barud (Substitute—PRI).
 Nayarit: Rigoberto Ochoa Zaragoza
 Nuevo León: Fernando Canales (PRI)
 Oaxaca: Heladio Ramírez López (PRI)
 Puebla: Melquiades Morales Flores/Manuel Bartlett Díaz (PRI)
 Querétaro: Ignacio Loyola Vera (PRI)
 Quintana Roo: Mario Villanueva Madrid/Joaquín Hendricks Díaz (PRI)
 San Luis Potosí: Manuel Bartlett Díaz/Fernando Silva Nieto (PRI)
 Sinaloa: Renato Vega Alvarado/Juan S. Millán (PRI)
 Sonora: Armando López Nogales (PRI)
 Tabasco: Roberto Madrazo Pintado (PRI)
 Tamaulipas: Manuel Cavazos Lerma
 Tlaxcala: José Antonio Álvarez Lima (PRI)
 Veracruz: Patricio Chirinos Calero/Miguel Alemán Velasco (PRI)
 Yucatán: Víctor Cervera Pacheco (PRI)
 Zacatecas: Ricardo Monreal Ávila (PRI)
Head of Government of the Federal District
Cuauhtémoc Cárdenas, Party of the Democratic Revolution (PRD), (until September 29)
Rosario Robles (PRD) (starting September 29)

Events

 El diario de Daniela begins airing on television. 
 March 18: The TV channel Canal del Congreso is launched. 
 April 21: the Pinacoteca Diego Rivera is inaugurated. 
 August 30: 1998 Mexican Fobaproa funds referendum 
 September 14: Camila (telenovela) begins. 
 September 19: Nuestra Belleza México 1998

Awards
Belisario Domínguez Medal of Honor – José Angel Conchello Dávila (post mortem)
 Ohtli Award
Burton E. Grossman
 Dolores Huerta
 Pete Rodriguez
 Guadalupe Reyes

Hurricanes

 August 21–24: Tropical Storm Charley (1998) 
 September 1–3: Hurricane Isis (1998) 
 October 15–26: Hurricane Lester (1998) 
 October 16–20: Hurricane Madeline (1998) 
 October 22 – November 9: Hurricane Mitch

Sport

 1997–98 Mexican Primera División season. 
 Guerreros de Oaxaca win the Mexican League.
 March 20: Homenaje a Salvador Lutteroth (1998) 
 July 18: Ruleta de la Muerte (1998) 
 December 13: Guerra de Titanes (1998)

Births
 April 3 - Humberto Castellanos, baseball player
 November 10 – Karen Villanueva, rhythmic gymnast

Deaths
 September 5 – Fernando Balzaretti, actor (b. 1946)
 December 13 – Ariadna Welter, actress (b. 1930)

References

 
Years in Mexico
Mexico